Antrostomus is a  genus of nightjars formerly included in the genus Caprimulgus. They are medium-sized nocturnal birds with long pointed wings, short legs and short bills.

Antrostomus nightjars are found in the New World, and like other nightjars they usually nest on the ground. They are mostly active in the late evening and early morning or at night, and feed predominantly on moths and other large flying insects. Most have small feet, of little use for walking, and their soft plumage is cryptically coloured to resemble bark or leaves. They have relatively long bills and rictal bristles. Some species, unusually for birds, perch along a branch, rather than across it, which helps to conceal them during the day. Temperate species are strongly migratory, wintering in the tropics. Many have repetitive and often mechanical songs.

These species were formerly placed in the genus Caprimulgus but were moved to the resurrected genus Antrostomus based on the results of a molecular phylogenetic study published in 2010. The genus Antrostomus was erected by the French naturalist Charles Bonaparte in 1838 with the chuck-will's-widow (Antrostomus carolinensis) as the type species. The generic name combines the Ancient Greek antron meaning "cavern" and stoma meaning "mouth".

Species
The genus contains 12 species:
Chuck-will's-widow  Antrostomus carolinensis
Rufous nightjar,  Antrostomus rufus
Cuban nightjar,  Antrostomus cubanensis
Hispaniolan nightjar, Antrostomus ekmani
Tawny-collared nightjar,  Antrostomus salvini
Yucatan nightjar,  Antrostomus badius
Buff-collared nightjar,  Antrostomus ridgwayi
Eastern whip-poor-will,  Antrostomus vociferus
Mexican whip-poor-will, Antrostomus arizonae
Dusky nightjar,  Antrostomus saturatus
Puerto Rican nightjar,  Antrostomus noctitherus
Silky-tailed nightjar,  Antrostomus sericocaudatus

References

 
Bird genera
Taxa named by Charles Lucien Bonaparte